Fong Kay Yian (born 5 November 1996) is a Singaporean diver.

Early life and education
Kay Yian studied at the Singapore Sports School and graduated from Republic Polytechnic with a Diploma in Sports and Leisure Management.  She pursued a Bachelor's degree in Psychological Science at James Cook University Singapore (JCU) and graduated with Honours in July 2022. She was the very first recipient of JCU’s Sports Scholarship.

Diving career
In 2013, Kay Yian took part in the 2013 Asian Youth Games held in Nanjing and was ranked 7th in the 3 m springboard event.  In December, she took part in the 2013 Southeast Asian Games along with her partner Myra Lee in the women's synchronized 3 m springboard event which the duo won the bronze medal.

At the 2015 Southeast Asian Games in Singapore, Kay Yian won a silver medal in the women's synchronized 3 m springboard event with her partner Ashlee Tan. She also participated in the women's 3 m springboard event, which she won herself a bronze medal.

At the 2017 Southeast Asian Games in Kuala Lumpur, Kay Yian won the gold medal with Ashlee in the women's 3 m synchronized springboard event, even though the duo finished second, as gold-winning diver Ng Yan Yee failed a doping test which resulted in the Malaysian team being stripped of the gold medal. It was Singapore's first diving title at the Games since Sally Lim captured the women's 3 m springboard gold on home soil at the 1973 Games. 

At the 2019 Southeast Asian Games in Philippines, Kay Yian and Ashlee won the silver medal in the women's 3 m synchronized springboard event. 

At the 2021 Southeast Asian Games in Hanoi, Kay Yian won a bronze medal in the women's 3 m springboard event. Even though Ashlee and her finished third in the women's synchronized 3 m springboard event, no bronze medal was awarded as only three pairs of divers competed in the event.

References 

1996 births
Singaporean female divers
Living people
Singaporean sportspeople of Chinese descent
Divers at the 2014 Asian Games
Southeast Asian Games gold medalists for Singapore
Southeast Asian Games silver medalists for Singapore
Southeast Asian Games bronze medalists for Singapore
Southeast Asian Games medalists in diving
Divers at the 2018 Asian Games
Competitors at the 2013 Southeast Asian Games
Competitors at the 2015 Southeast Asian Games
Asian Games competitors for Singapore
Competitors at the 2021 Southeast Asian Games